Several ships of the Argentine Navy have been named Nueve de Julio.

 , a protected cruiser.
 , a light cruiser.

Nueve de Julio, ARA